Raymond Eldred Siday (1912–1956) was an English mathematician specialising in quantum mechanics. He obtained his B.Sc. in Special Physics and later worked at Edinburgh University. He began collaborating with Werner Ehrenberg in 1933.

Raymond Siday is known for the Ehrenberg–Siday effect.

Family
He was the brother of Eric Siday, a pioneer of electronic music and Gentleman racing driver

Ehrenberg–Siday–Aharonov–Bohm effect 

The Ehrenberg–Siday effect, later known as the Aharonov–Bohm effect, is a quantum mechanical phenomenon by which a charged particle is affected by electromagnetic fields in regions from which the particle is excluded. The earliest form of this effect was predicted by Ehrenberg and Siday in 1949, and similar effects were later rediscovered by Aharonov and Bohm in 1959.

Such effects are predicted to arise from both magnetic fields and electric fields, but the magnetic version has been easier to observe. In general, the consequence of Aharonov–Bohm effects is that knowledge of the classical electromagnetic field acting locally on a particle is not sufficient to predict its quantum-mechanical behavior.

Selected papers

References

Siday, R. E.
Siday, R. E.
Siday, Raymond Eldred
British mathematicians